Mission La Purísima, was founded west of Loreto in Baja California Sur, by the Jesuit missionary Nicolás Tamaral in 1720 and financed by the Marqués de Villapuente de la Peña and his wife the Marquesa de las Torres de Rada.

By 1735 it had been moved to a new location at the Cochimí ranchería known as Cadegomó, meaning "arroyo of the carrizos", about 30 kilometers south of the original site. The mission was dedicated to the Immaculate Conception.

The mission was abandoned in 1822.

In the early twentieth century, the church was still in use, but by the start of the following century only a few traces of structures remained.

See also

 
 List of Jesuit sites

References
 Vernon, Edward W. 2002. Las Misiones Antiguas: The Spanish Missions of Baja California. Viejos Press, Santa Barbara, California.

Purisima Concepcion de Cadegomo
Loreto Municipality (Baja California Sur)
1720 establishments in New Spain